Mette Davidsen (born 26 June 1976, in Bergen) is a Norwegian team handball player and World Champion from 1999 with the Norwegian national team. She received a silver medal at the 1997 World Championship and a bronze medal in 1993. She is European Champion from 1998 after beating Denmark in the final, and received a silver medal in 1996. Mette Davidsen played 148 games for the national team during her career, scoring 256 goals.

References

External links

1976 births
Living people
Sportspeople from Bergen
Norwegian female handball players
Olympic handball players of Norway
Handball players at the 1996 Summer Olympics